The Mesogeia or Mesogaia ("Midlands") is a geographical region of Attica in Greece.

History
The term designates since antiquity the inland portion of the Attic peninsula. In the Classical period, the mesogeia comprised about 47 settlements (demoi).

In modern usage, the term refers to the central portion of East Attica, separated from the Athens basin by Mount Hymettus, and delineated to the north by Mount Penteli and to the south by the mountains of south Attica (Merenta, Laureotic Olympus). To the east the Mesogeia reaches the Aegean Sea at the Petalioi Gulf, but is separated from the actual coastline by a line of low hills. In the late Middle Ages, the area was the site of Albanian (Arvanite) settlement, as can be seen from toponyms such as Spata or Liopesi.

Before the 2011 Kallikratis reform, the area comprised the municipalities of Gerakas, Glyka Nera, Anthousa, Pallini, Paiania, Pikermi, Spata, Artemida, Rafina, Markopoulo Mesogaias, Keratea, Koropi, Kalyvia Thorikou, Vari, Kouvaras, and Voula. Its main settlement is Spata, and its main harbour is Rafina. The Athens International Airport is also located near Spata.

Maps

See also
 Mesogeia Painter
 Mesogeion Avenue

References

Sources
 

Ancient Athens
Geography of ancient Attica
Geography of East Attica